Anthony Richard Denman (born October 22, 1979) is an American actor.

Filmography

Film

Television

External links

1979 births
American male film actors
American male television actors
American male child actors
Living people
Male actors from Minneapolis